Black Milk is the third album by Australian blues rock band Beasts of Bourbon which was recorded in 1990 and originally released on the Red Eye label.

Details
Salmon said, "We recorded Black Milk with all these crazy dynamics and there's too many ideas on it really. I love it! The Beasts Of Bourbon really believed could do anything. I was willing to use that idea to get my songs on, like "Cool Fire" would never dare be presented to the Scientists – it's an old 40s sounding song. We've tried to be like Dr. John, every song on the album is different."

Reception

In the review on Allmusic, Skip Jansen states "Third album from the Australian garage punk and pub rock super-group is a fine album of lurching blues-driven rock, though it pales by comparison to the two previous albums".

Track listing 
All songs by Spencer Jones and Tex Perkins except where noted
 "Black Milk" – 5:55
 "Finger Lickin'" – 2:09
 "Cool Fire" (Kim Salmon) – 4:13
 "Bad Revisited" – 3:58
 "Hope You Find Your Way to Heaven" (Salmon) – 2:40
 "Words from a Woman to Her Man" (Salmon) – 2:48
 "I'm So Happy I Could Cry" (Salmon) – 4:18
 "You Let Me Down" (Jones) – 4:33
 "Let's Get Funky" (Hound Dog Taylor) – 3:35
 "A Fate Much Worse Than Life" – 3:09
 "El Beasto" (Salmon, Perkins) – 1:33
 "Blue Stranger" (Salmon, Perkins) – 4:12
 "I've Let You Down Again" (Salmon, Perkins) – 2:33
 "Blanc Garcon" – 4:12
 "Execution Day" (Jones) – 4:46
 "Rest in Peace" (Perkins) – 3:12

Personnel 
Beasts of Bourbon
Tex Perkins – vocals, guitar
Spencer Jones – guitar, vocal, banjo-mandolin
Kim Salmon – guitar, fish, vocals
Boris Sudjovic – bass
James Baker – drums, percussion
with:
Louis Tillett – piano
Peter Casanela – piano accordion
Dr. Bronstontine Karlarka, Hellen Rose – vocals

Production
Phil Punch – engineer
Phil Punch and The Beasts – producer

Charts

References 

Beasts of Bourbon albums
1990 albums
Red Eye Records (label) albums